The Kreuger family in Sweden originated from Johan Kröger (died 1739) from Germany, who immigrated to Kalmar in 1710. He started a bakery in Kalmar in 1710 and married Helena Schultz.

Johan Kröger 
Johan Kröger married Helena Schultz in 1710. However she died the same year. His second wife (name unknown) had at least three sons that changed the spelling of the last name from Kröger to Kreuger but with the same pronunciation (eu like in the French word fleur):

Peter Kreuger became a clerk in the Swedish Navy in Karlskrona.
Sven Kreuger continued his father's business with the bakery in Kalmar.
Anders Kreuger (1720–1778), started a workshop in Kalmar in 1746 and worked also in the real estate business. He married Maria Bodecker.

Anders Kreuger (1720-1778) 
Anders Kreuger and Maria Bodecker had several children, and at least two sons:
Johan Fredrik Kreüger (1753–1823) worked within the customs administration and moved from Kalmar to Porvoo in Finland.
Peter Kreuger (1758–1807), married Ulrika Åbrandt. He started a combined trading and shipowner company in Kalmar.

Johan Fredrik Kreüger (1753-1823)
Johan Fredrik Kreuger married twice; 1780 with Anna Sara Cederhvarf (1760–1799) and in 1801 with Agata Charlotta Ivendorff (1774–1850). In the first marriage he got a son, the Navy officer Johan Henrik Kreüger (1782–1858) that in the end of his career, 1857 was appointed admiral for the Swedish Navy.  He was also known for diplomatic skills, particular in negotiations with foreign states regarding reducing customs charges for Swedish goods. He was also an inventor of marine related equipment. At the world exhibition in London (1851) and in Paris (1855) he was awarded for his new anemometer (measuring wind speed), that eventually was used for more than 30 years along the Swedish coast. His anemometer did not work with the principle of transferring a rotating shaft to a wind scale but a static wind force to a scale that proved to be very reliable and accurate.

Peter Kreuger (1758–1807) 
Peter Kreuger and his wife Ulrika Åbrandt had several children:
Anders Lorentz Kreuger (1791–1859), married in 1819 to Maria Callerström (1794–1868). Anders Lorenz Kreuger started a trading business in timber and also ran a shipowner company and was appointed the vice consul for Russia in Kalmar.

Anders Lorentz Kreuger (1791–1859) 
Anders Lorentz Kreuger and Maria Callerström had at least three sons and one daughter:
Pehr Edward Kreuger (1820–1894), married 1846 to Carolina Amalia von Sydow (1820–1893).
Johan August Kreuger (1821–1887), married 1852 to Christina Elisabeth Lidman (1831–1878), continued to run the timber trading business his father had founded. One of his sons was the Swedish painter Nils Kreuger (1858–1930).
Erik Lorentz Kreuger (1823–1913), married 1857 to Carolina Eleonora Sophia Brusenius (1820–1888). Beside his work as a farmer he invested some of his savings in Fredriksdahl Match Manufacturing Co. in Kalmar. He was the first family member to get involved in the match industry.
Elisabeth Kreuger, married to Joseph Jennings, a wealthy immigrant from England.

Pehr Edward Kreuger (1820–1894) 
Together with Joseph Jennings, Pehr Edward's sisters husband, Pehr Edward Kreuger founded the trading and shipowner company P.E. Kreuger & Jennings Co. Joseph Jennings died after just a few years. Pehr Edward Kreuger then continued to run the company by himself. Together with his brother Erik Lorentz Kreuger, he also founded a pulp and paper company close to Emån and in 1871 they bought Fredriksdahl Match Manufacturing Co. Per Edward Kreuger was appointed the vice consul for Russia in Kalmar after his father.

Pehr Edward Kreuger and Carolina had several sons and two daughters:
Hilma Amalia Kreuger (born 1847), married 1870 to captain (naval) Carl von Diederichs (born 1838).
Oscar Lorentz Kreuger (born 1848) married 1874 to Ebba Sparre af Söfdeborg (born 1855).
Ernst August Kreuger (1852–1946), married to Jenny Emelie (1856–1949), born Forssman, the parents of Ivar Kreuger. 
Carolina Maria (Lina) Kreuger (born 1856), married 1878 to Gotthard Magnus Gullberg (born 1845).
Fredrik Kreuger (born 1858), married 1892 to Emily Griffins. He established a match trading company in London around 1880 and lived most of the time in London, but visited Kalmar from time to time.

Ernst August Kreuger (1852–1946)
Ernst August Kreuger became the manager for Fredriksdahl Match Manufacturing Co. after his father (Pehr Edward) and together with his brother Fredrik Kreuger he founded two other match companies; Mönsterås Match Manufacturing Co. and Kalmar Match Manufacturing Co. In parallel with the match manufacturing business in Sweden, Fredrik Kreuger also worked with his match trading business in London.

Ernst August brother, Oscar Lorentz Kreuger, founded his own company in Kalmar. He had two sons, Henrik Kreüger (1882–1953) and Erik Kreüger.

Ernst August Kreuger and Jenny Emelie
Ernst August Kreuger and Jenny Emelie had four daughters and two sons:

Ingrid (Kreuger) Ahlström, (1877–1973), married in 1908 to professor Erik Ahlström at the Karolinska Institutet in Stockholm. 
Helga (Kreuger) Hallin, (1878–1969), married in 1906 to the bank manager Axel Hallin (1877–1948), one of Ivar Kreugers advisers in his bank establishments.
Ivar Kreuger, (1880–1932). 
Torsten Kreuger, (1884–1973), engineer M.Sc., planned and built Kalmar match manufacturing factory for his father Ernst and uncle Fredrik. 
Greta (Kreuger) Ekström, (1889–1982), married in 1912 to one of the managers in Swedish Match, engineer Gunnar Ekström (1878–1957). 
Britta Kreuger, (1891–1985), never married.

Around 1911–1912 Ernst and his brother Fredrik Kreuger encountered financial problems with their companies in Kalmar. This was the time when Ernst son Ivar Kreuger entered the match business. Ivar was advised by his banker Oscar Rydbeck to turn the factories into a stock corporation in order to raise more capital. This was the starting point for the reformation of the entire Swedish match manufacturing industry as well as the largest match companies in Norway and Finland and finally in 1917 Ivar Kreuger founded the Swedish Match by merging with the largest match company at time in Scandinavia, Jönköping match industry, that had been established in many countries all around the world for many years. This new group then covered the entire Scandinavian match industry and the road laid open for the worldwide expansion.

See also
Ivar Kreuger
Henrik Kreüger
Nils Kreuger
Torsten Kreuger

Gallery - Kreuger family

Gallery - Ernst and Fredrik Kreuger match manufacturing factories in the Kalmar area

Others
Another person with the name Kröger in Kalmar is described in a Swedish encyclopedic dictionary from 1911, when Ivar Kreuger was working as a construction engineer in Stockholm and had not yet become known to the general public. It was David Kröger (usually related to with spelling Kreuger), a captain (nautical) from Wismar in Germany that died in Kalmar 1730. Whether David Kröger and Johan Kröger, the baker, belonged to the same family, is not clear.

References

 Kalmar city historical archive and Kalmar museum.
 Ernst G. Aréen, essay Kreuger family, published in a private book as a gift to Ivar Kreuger when he celebrated his 50th birthday, 1930.

Swedish families
1739 deaths
Business families of Sweden
Swedish families of German ancestry
Year of birth unknown